Tamradhwaj Sahu (born 6 August 1949) is an Indian politician of the INC. He is the current Home Minister of Chhattisgarh. He is a member of the Chhattisgarh Legislative Assembly representing Durg Gramin.

Political career
Tamradhwaj Sahu was member of parliament to the 16th Lok Sabha from Durg (Lok Sabha constituency), Chhattisgarh. He won the 2014 Indian general election being an Indian National Congress candidate. Before becoming the Member of Parliament, he was a member of Chhattisgarh Legislative Assembly from 1998 until 2013. Currently, he is the Home Minister of Chhattisgarh.

Political views
Sahu is inspired by Chandulal Chandrakar, former Politician of Durg. He ventured into politics as a student.

Personal life
Sahu was born in Patora village, Bemetara, Central Provinces and Berar (now Chhattisgarh) on 6 August 1949. He is married to Kamala Sahu. They have three sons and a daughter.

Social activities
He has actively worked for the Sahu Samaj Cultural Activities, and involved in Ramayan Katha.

See also
Chhattisgarh Legislative Assembly
2013 Chhattisgarh Legislative Assembly election
2008 Chhattisgarh Legislative Assembly election

References

1949 births
Living people
India MPs 2014–2019
Indian National Congress politicians
Lok Sabha members from Chhattisgarh
People from Durg district
Chhattisgarh MLAs 2018–2023